Jinan University (JNU) is a public research university based in Guangzhou, China. "Jinan" literally means "reaching southward", indicating the university's original mission to disseminate Chinese learning and culture from North to South when it was founded in 1906 in Nanjing. It is the first Chinese university to recruit foreign students and one of the universities with the largest number of international students in China.

Jinan University is currently administered by the Overseas Chinese Affairs Office of the State Council and the Chinese Ministry of Education. It is part of the Double First Class University Plan and former Project 211 for leading national universities. The most distinguished subjects of JNU include Pharmacy, Chemistry, Economics, Finance, Journalism, and Chinese Language and Literature.

Jinan University is a relatively selective university in China that only accepts students with a National College Entrance Examination score at top 5%. It is ranked 401-500 globally by the 2021 Academic Ranking of World Universities.

History 

In 1906, Duanfang, the Viceroy of Liangjiang, submitted a memorandum to the Guangxu Emperor, proposing that an overseas Chinese school be set up for the purpose of spreading far and wide the enlightening influence of education and strengthening the emotional ties with compatriots overseas. The Guangxu Emperor approved of his proposal and thus Duanfang was honored as the founder of Jinan University. On March 23, 1907. Jinan Academy was founded in Nanjing, becoming the first of its kind in Chinese history and serving as a curtain-raiser for the later development of overseas Chinese education.

In 1927, Jinan Academy was renamed National Jinan University, located in Shanghai. After the foundation of the People's Republic of China (PRC) in 1949, Jinan University was closed and its schools were merged with those of other university such as Fudan University. In 1958, Jinan University was reestablished in Guangzhou.

University name
The name "Jinan" (Han characters: 暨南, means "reaching southward") comes from the Classic of History, a compilation of documentary records related to events in ancient Chinese history. The articles reads, "His speech and teachings spread from  South, from China to the rest of the world.

Timeline
1906 - Jinan Academy, the predecessor of Jinan University was established in Nanjing.
1918 - Jinan Academy moved to Shanghai.
1927 - Jinan Academy was renamed Jinan National University.
1941-1946 - Jinan University moved to Fujian Province during the Second Sino-Japanese War.
1949 - Jinan National University was merged into Fudan University and Jiaotong University.
1958 - Jinan University was re-established in Guangzhou.
1983 - Jinan University pioneered in the country the implementation of credit system.
1996 - Jinan University passed the pre-examination of the "211 program" related department and was put into the "top 100 normal universities" list, which would get prior construction in the 21st century.
2001 - College of Journalism and Communication, College of Information Science and Technology, College of Foreign Studies, Pharmacy College, Law School and International School were established. 
2002 - Jinan University started to launch EMBA Program with approval from the Degree Administration Office of the State Council. As one of the first group of universities. 
2006 - The celebration ceremony of the 100th Anniversary of Jinan University was held.
2011 - The Graduate School of Jinan University was established.
2014 - The new campus was established in Guangzhou Higher Education Mega Center.

Location and campus 

The university has five campuses:
 Main campus, Tianhe District, Guangzhou
 College of Chinese language and culture, Tianhe, Guangzhou
 Panyu campus, Panyu, Guangzhou  
 Zhuhai Campus, Xiangzhou, Zhuhai
 Tourism College, Shenzhen

Administration 
Jinan University has 27 colleges, comprising 59 departments and offering 89 undergraduate major fields. Among the 55 departments, 43 offer master's degree programs and 19 offer Ph.D. degree-granting programs. There are 15 postdoctoral research stations, 182 research institutes and 77 labs in Jinan University.

The university has four national key disciplines, eight key disciplines of the Overseas Chinese Affairs Office of the State Council, 20 Guangdong Province Level-I key disciplines, and four Guangdong Province Level-II key disciplines. The university has a key research base of national humanity and social sciences, a teaching and research base for Chinese language and literature of the Education Ministry, a base for national university cultural quality education, a base of national base for teaching Chinese as a foreign language, an educational base for overseas Chinese education of the Overseas Chinese Affairs Office of the State Council, and a key research base of humanity and social science of Guangdong Province. The university has one national engineering center, 7 ministerial centers (engineering centers of the Ministry of Education) and provincial centers, and 11 key ministerial and provincial key laboratories.

There are 50,535 students in the university, including 10,767 graduates and 22,527 undergraduates. The number of overseas students, including foreign students, overseas Chinese students, students from Hong Kong, Macao and Taiwan, is 13,512.

The current president is Dr. Hu Jun. It has recently started a new undergraduate course MBBS, with mainly Indian students.

University achievements
 One of the oldest universities in China and one of the Double First Class Universities in China
 The first university in China to recruit foreign students
 The first university in China to enroll students at both spring and autumn semesters
 The first university that pioneered the implementation of credit system in China
 The university with the largest number of overseas students
 The only university which have alumni in both Chinese and foreign state-level leaders in China

Cooperation
Jinan University has been active at academic exchanges, and has established academic cooperation or academic exchange liaison with more than 180 universities and research institutes in Asia, the Americas, Europe, and Oceania. It partnered with City University, Malaysia to form an international think tank on Sino-Malaysian cooperation under the Belt and Road Initiative.

Now the university has 57 regional alumni associations all over the world.

Colleges and schools 
 International School
 College of Liberal Arts
 College of Foreign Studies
 College of Journalism and Communication
 College of Arts
 College of Economics
 Management School
 Law school
 Department of international studies
 College of Intellectual Property
 College of Science and Engineering
 College of Information Science and Technology
 College of Life Science and Technology
 Medical school
 The First Clinical Medical School
 The Second Clinical Medical School
 Pharmacy College
 College of Chinese Language and Culture
 School of Humanities
 School of Translation Studies
 International Business School
 College of Electrical & Information
 Shenzhen Tourism College of Jinan University
 Education College

International School

The International School is a college, which provides programs taught exclusively in English. The School was established to cater to the escalating needs of Overseas Chinese and foreign students and selected high-caliber students from China. The Undergraduate Programs include International Journalism (IJ), Food Science and Engineering (FSE), Computer Science (CS), International Economics and Trade (IET), Clinical Medicine (CM), Accounting (CPA Canada), Pharmacy, Public Administration (ADM), Finance (FNC) and Bachelor of Medicine, Bachelor of Surgery (MBBS).

In order for students to gain various experiences worldwide, the International School developed several visiting and exchange programs with partner universities in the US, Canada, UK, Ireland, Germany, France, Australia, and New Zealand on a long and short basis.

Management School
Base on JNU humanity tradition and accumulation of disciplines, School of Management tries the best to be one of top business schools in China for cultivating talents in management, it has deep understanding in Chinese culture, globalization with modern business education.

In 2011, Jinan University MBA programs were granted international accreditation of AMBA.

College of Chinese Language and Culture
The college was conferred as the "National Base of Teaching Chinese as a Foreign Language" by The Education Ministry, and "Overseas Chinese Education Base" by Overseas Chinese Affairs Office of the State Council. The college has become the top college in South China offering the programs of teaching Chinese as a second or foreign language and overseas Chinese education.

The college consists of the Department of Teaching Chinese as a Second or Foreign Language, the Department of Overseas Chinese Education, the Department of Applied Linguistics, Pre-University Department, Correspondence Course Department, Overseas Chinese Education Researching Institute, Overseas Chinese Researching Center, and Internet & Educational Technology Center.

Rankings

Controversies

Misuse of personal information for facilitating pro-Beijing candidate in 2019 Hong Kong local elections 
Apple Daily Hong Kong reported that during 2019 Hong Kong local elections, they received complaints from Hong Kong students who were studying at Jinan University. In accordance with the complaints, many students from Hong Kong were requested to meet the academic staff or counselors separately. During the meetings, the university staff members were able to mention the constituency that the students belonged to. The students were requested to vote for the pro-Beijing candidates, while the university might provide free transportation for them.

Notable alumni
Wu Xueqian, former Chinese Foreign Minister
Li Lanqing, politician
Jack C. K. Teng, educator, writer, politician, diplomat and Olympic pioneer
Lee Kong Chian, businessman and philanthropist active in Malaya and Singapore from the 1930s to the 1960s
Huang Binhong, art historian and literati painter
Hu Zhiying, artist, educator, poet
Cheng Yiu-tong, Hong Kong politician
Zhang Tielin, actor and film director, dean of the art school of Jinan University
Su Bingtian, track and field athlete who competes in sprints
Lau Cheok Va, president of the Legislative Assembly of Macau
Kwan Tsui Hang, member of the Legislative Assembly of Macau
Ho Iat Seng, member of the Legislative Assembly of Macau
Wong Kwok-hing, Hong Kong trade unionist and member of the Legislative Council of Hong Kong
Shen Hongfei, writer, producer and food columnist
Prasit Khanchanawat, Thai parliament president
Tan Qixiang, historical geographer, academician
Deng Ximing, academician
Hou Fusheng, petroleum engineer, academician
Zeng Yi, academician

See also 
Japan Campus of Foreign Universities

References

External links

 Jinan University Official website 
 Jinan University Official website 
 Jinan University International School website

 
Universities and colleges in Guangzhou
Educational institutions established in 1958
Educational institutions established in 1906
Medical schools in China
Universities in China with English-medium medical schools
1958 establishments in China
1906 establishments in China
Project 211
Plan 111